Romeo V. Turcan (born 24 April 1970) is a professor at Aalborg University Business School. His research interests include creation and legitimation of new sectors and new organizations; Late-globalization, de-globalization, de-internationalization; Bubbles, collective behavior; High impact international entrepreneurship; and Cross-disciplinary theory building.

Education and career 
Turcan holds a degree in mechanical engineering from the Air Force Engineering Military Academy, Riga, Latvia (1992) and in Philology from the Department of Post-University Studies, Moldova State University, Chișinău, Moldova (1995). In 2000, he received his MSc in International Marketing from the Department of Marketing, University of Strathclyde, Glasgow, United Kingdom; and in 2006, he received his PhD in International Entrepreneurship from the Hunter Centre for Entrepreneurship, University of Strathclyde.

Prior to commencing his academic career, Turcan worked in a range of posts involving public policy intervention in restructuring, rationalizing and modernizing business and public sectors such as power, oil, military high-tech, management consulting, information and communications technology (ICT) and higher education. In addition, he is the co-founder and former Executive Director of the International Association of Business and Parliament – Moldova.

He has also been a member of various boards including the board of Enterprise and Parliamentary Dialogue International, London, UK (2013-2019) and the board of The International Society of Markets and Development (2019-). He is chairman of the Organization of Moldovans in Denmark.

He is currently the project coordinator for the ERASMUS + Strategic Partnership project (2019-2023) and the H2020 Marie S. Curie project (2020-2024). In addition, he is the Founder and Coordinator of the Theory Building Research Program (2012-).

Honors 
Since 2012, Turcan has been the main applicant and coordinator of four EU funded projects, incl., Marie S. Curie ITN, with a total value of more than 7.3 mil EUR:

 "Legitimation of Newness and Its Impact on EU Agenda for Change", Marie S. Curie project (2020-2023, main applicant and coordinator)
 "International Entrepreneurship Network for PhD and PhD Supervisor Training", Strategic Partnership (Erasmus+) project (2019-2022, main applicant and coordinator)
 "PBLMD-TOPUP", ERASMUS+ Learning Mobility of Individuals (2017-2018, main applicant and coordinator)
 "Introducing Problem Based Learning in Moldova: Toward Enhancing Students’ Competitiveness and Employability", ERASMUS+ Capacity Building national project (2015-2019, main applicant and coordinator)
 "Enhancing University Autonomy in Moldova", ERASMUS+ Capacity Building structural project (2012-2015, main applicant and coordinator)

Publications

References 

Academic staff of Aalborg University
People from Drochia District
1970 births
Living people
Moldovan people
Mechanical engineers